People & Love is an album by vibraphonist Johnny Lytle recorded in 1972 and originally issued on the Milestone label.

Reception
Allmusic reviewer Brandon Burke stated "People & Love finds him diving ever deeper into the soul-jazz groove. The results are successful, to say the least. ...Recommended for fans of downtempo jazz-funk.

Track listing
All compositions by Johnny Lytle except as indicated
 "Where Is the Love" (Ralph MacDonald, William Salter) - 5:04
 "Libra" - 8:59
 "Family" - 3:49
 "Tawhid" (Daahoud Hadi) - 7:00
 "People Make the World Go 'Round" (Thom Bell, Linda Creed) - 11:57

Personnel
Johnny Lytle - vibraphone
Marvin Cabell - flute, alto flute, tenor saxophone
Daahoud Hadi (Butch Cornell) - organ, electric piano
Bob Cranshaw - electric bass 
Josell Carter - drums
Arthur Jenkins, Jr. - congas, percussion
Betty Glamann - harp

References

Milestone Records albums
Johnny Lytle albums
1972 albums
Albums produced by Orrin Keepnews